Fudbalski klub Sarajevo is a professional football club based in Sarajevo, the capital city of Bosnia and Herzegovina, and is one of the most successful in the country.

This is a season-by-season record of the club's league performances:

SFR Yugoslavia (1946–1992)

Bosnia and Herzegovina (1994–present)

Notes
1 Goals in all competitions are counted.
2 From 1947–48 to 1951 the Yugoslav Second League was known as the United League (Jedinstvena liga).
3 The 1952 season was shortened and sped-up. The reason for the change was a desire to implement the fall-spring competition format. The competition took place in two phases. In the first clubs were divided into two preliminary groups of 6 teams. Based on their ranking at the end of preliminary groups they were promoted to three further groups: Title, Central and Relegation. Each of them containing 4 teams.
4 Cup competition was not held for 1955–56 and 1974–75 seasons.
5 First title in domestic league competitions.
6 Between 1988–89 and 1991–92, drawn games went to penalties with the winners of the shoot out gaining the point. Figures in brackets represent points won in such shoot outs.
7 Midway through the 1991–92 season the club, along with other Bosnian and Macedonian sides, abandoned the competition as Bosnia and Herzegovina gained independence from Yugoslavia (Slovenian and Croatian sides had succeeded a few months prior). The resulting war would halt competitive football in the country for four years.
8 The first season of the First League of Bosnia and Herzegovina was played in 1994–95. Four regional groups were organized, with the winners and runners-up from each group competing in a Play-off format for the title.
9 The 1997–98 season broke the ethnic barrier for the first time since the war, with a Play-off between winners of the all-Bosniak First League of Bosnia and Herzegovina and the Croat First League organized for the national title. This format was kept until the 1999–2000 season when a joint league was formed, with the Play-off system being scrapped.
10 The 2000–01 competition was renamed the Premier League of Bosnia and Herzegovina. It was only contested by Bosniak and Croatian clubs.
11 The 2001–02 season was the debut year for Serbian clubs from the Republika Srpska. They had previously competed in the First League of the Republika Srpska.
12 The 2016–17 season was the first to be organized with 12 team and a two-stage format - Regular season league and Championship/Relegation league rounds. The top six teams in the regular season qualify for the Championship league round, while the bottom six compete between themselves in an effort to avoid relegation.
13 In the 2018–19 season the league returned the one-stage format, by which every team played a total of 33 games. After all teams play each other two times, once at home and once away, the third game is played on a ground which is determined using the Berger system.
14 The 2019–20 season was suspended in March 2020 due to the COVID-19 pandemic in Bosnia and Herzegovina. The season was curtailed and the final standings (including Sarajevo as champions) were declared by a points-per-game ratio on 1 June 2020.

References

External links
Official Website 
FK Sarajevo at UEFA
FKSinfo 

Seasons